Walter Walmsley Bowtell (26 January 1895 – 23 March 1975) was an Australian rules footballer who played with Richmond in the Victorian Football League (VFL).

Notes

External links 

1895 births
1975 deaths
Australian rules footballers from Victoria (Australia)
Richmond Football Club players
Northcote Football Club players